Yaogun Beijing (摇滚北京 Beijing Rock) is a seminal 1993 Chinese rock compilation album showcasing the first generation Beijing bands. Two further compilations appeared in 1994 and 1996.

Yaogun Beijing I

 qĭng zŏu rénhángdào. Compass (band)
 zhè yīkè wŏ shì zhēnxīnde. Compass
 bù yào cōngmáng. Xīndì yuèduì
 zìjĭ	de tiāntáng. Cobra (Chinese band)
 ānhún	jìnxíngqū. Wang Yong (musician)
 liănpŭ. Black Panther (band)
 fēnghu Yángzhōulù. Again (band)
 xīwàng zhī guāng. Dou Wei's Dream the Dream
 zŭxiān de yīnyĭng. Overload
 xīn shìjiè. Breathing (band)

Yaogun Beijing II

 qílè shìjiè 其乐世界. Zìjué band 自觉乐队
 wàng shì 往世. Battleaxe 战斧乐队
 mèng 梦. The Face (band)
 wēibùzúdào 微不足道. Xuéwèi band 穴位乐队
 wǒ bù lěi 我不累. The Face
 bǎ mén dǎkāi 把门打开. Hóngtáo 5 band 红桃5乐队
 běijīng shízhōng. 北京时钟. Stone band 石头乐队
 shān gē 山歌. Again (band)
 měilì de línghún 美丽的灵魂. Wáng Xiùjuān 王秀鹃
 mò yī mò 抹一抹 Thin Man (band)

Yaogun Beijing III

 wǎn ān běijīng 晚安 北京 43 Baojia Street 鲍家街43号乐队
 jiǔ dào 酒道. Ziyue (band)
 èmèng zài jìxù 恶梦在继续. Míngjiè band 冥界乐队
 miào 妙. Chén Jìng 陈劲
 yú 鱼. Móhé band 磨合乐队
 zhào jìngzǐ 照镜子. Chén  Dǐlǐ 陈底里
 sùshuō yīnguǒ 诉说因果. Chūjiā de lièrén 出家的猎人乐队
 qīng píng lè 清平乐. Shāng biélí Wèi àidōng 伤别离 魏爱东
 yīn wèi suǒ yǐ 因为 所以. Zhōu Tóng and Again (band)

References

1993 compilation albums
1994 compilation albums
1996 compilation albums
Regional music compilation albums
Rock albums by Chinese artists
Rock compilation albums
Chinese-language compilation albums